Saeed Ahmad Bodla is a Pakistani artist and calligrapher. He belongs to Bodla family in Punjab.

Education and work 

He studied Fine arts from the University of the Punjab, Lahore. He has been worked on Islamic calligraphy mostly. His work also includes 99 names of Allah and surah al-muzammil.

Exhibitions 
 Alhamra Arts Council, 2004

References 

Living people
Pakistani calligraphers
Pakistani artists
Pakistani art collectors
Punjabi people
University of the Punjab alumni
Year of birth missing (living people)